Hugh Francis Brophy (29 May 1879 – 15 September 1932) was an Australian rules footballer who played with Fitzroy in the Victorian Football League (VFL).

Biography
Brophy was a son of Hugh Francis Brophy and Margaret Freaney who were born in Ireland and came to Australia during the nineteenth century. His father, who was involved in the building trade, was a staunch supporter of Irish independence his entire life and had arrived in Western Australia in 1868 after being convicted and transported for taking part in a Fenian uprising a few years earlier.

Frank Brophy, born in Carlton North, Victoria attended St. Colman's School in Fitzroy and later entered the department of the Postmaster General as a linesman. In December 1903 he fell off a roof while working on a local building and seriously injured his back and skull. This event forced him to alter his career to that of draughtsman.

Nots

References
Holmesby, Russell & Main, Jim (2009). The Encyclopedia of AFL Footballers. 8th ed. Melbourne: Bas Publishing.

External links

Australian rules footballers from Melbourne
1879 births
1932 deaths
Australian Rules footballers: place kick exponents
Fitzroy Football Club players
Burials at Melbourne General Cemetery
People from Carlton North, Victoria
Australian people of Irish descent